PDZ and LIM domain protein 2 is a protein that in humans is encoded by the PDLIM2 gene.

References

Further reading